Science of Mind is a guide for spiritual living published monthly by the Centers for Spiritual Living. Themes include inner peace, hope, healing, guidance, social justice and others. The magazine features articles that draw together secular philosophy, the theology of various world religions and elements of science. It has been in distribution since 1927.

Founded by Ernest Holmes, the magazine offers a unique blend of spiritual wisdom and "cutting-edge insights" designed to help readers use spiritual principles to live "happier, richer and more satisfying lives". Science of Mind magazine is one of the most highly regarded spiritual magazines in the New Thought movement.

The magazine is available at Barnes & Noble, Centers for Spiritual Living, Apple Newsstand, Amazon Kindle and independent book stores.

Contributors 
Notable contributors to and subjects of Science of Mind include:

 Michael Bernard Beckwith
 Bernie Siegel
 Marianne Williamson
 Eckhart Tolle
 Dan Millman
 Jean Houston
 Barbara Marx Hubbard
 Jack Kornfield

References

External links 
 Science of Mind magazine official website.
 Science of Mind magazine on the Centers for Spiritual Living website.

Monthly magazines published in the United States
Lifestyle magazines published in the United States
Audio periodicals
Downloadable magazines
Magazines about spirituality
Magazines established in 1927
New Thought magazines
Religious Science
Magazines published in Colorado
1927 establishments in Colorado